State Highway 3, also abbreviated as SH-3 or OK-3, is a highway maintained by the U.S. state of Oklahoma. Traveling diagonally through Oklahoma, from the Panhandle to the far southeastern corner of the state, SH-3 is the longest state highway in the Oklahoma road system, at a total length of  via SH-3E (see below).

Route description

In the northwest
At this terminus, it is concurrent with US-287/US-385. It remains concurrent with the two U.S. Routes until reaching Boise City, where it encounters a traffic circle which contains five other highways. After the circle, US-385 splits off, and SH-3 overlaps US-287, US-56, US-64, and US-412, though US-56 and US-287 both split off within the next .

In Guymon, US-64 splits off. At Elmwood, US-270 joins US-412, coming from a concurrency with State Highway 23. SH-3 remains concurrent with US-270 through Watonga. In Seiling, US-183 leaves the concurrency but is quickly replaced by U.S. Highway 281. SH-33 joins the roadbed  later.

In Watonga, SH-33 and SH-3 split off from US-270 and US-281. Highways 3 and 33 remain concurrent for 28 more miles, until Kingfisher, where SH-3 joins U.S. Highway 81. Three miles after Okarche, SH-3 leaves US-81. This marks the first point that SH-3 has not been part of a concurrency.

Through Oklahoma City
Beginning at the split from US-81, Highway 3 becomes a major artery in the Oklahoma City highway system, commonly known as the Northwest Expressway because it is a diagonal route and because it serves the northwestern part of the metro area. It skirts the northern limits of El Reno before entering the Oklahoma City limits. The often-congested Northwest Expressway passes through the suburb of Warr Acres and passes close to Lake Hefner.

At the intersection with the Lake Hefner Parkway, SH-3 again re-enters a concurrency. The Lake Hefner Parkway ends very shortly after, and SH-3 becomes concurrent with Interstate 44 through the western side of the city. Near Will Rogers World Airport, Highway 3 transfers to I-240 along the southern side of the city.

SH-3E/3W split
In Shawnee, SH-3 splits into two highways, SH-3E and SH-3W. SH-3W splits off I-40 onto U.S. Highway 177, along with US-270, at I-40 milemarker 181. It continues along with US-270 and 177 through the west side of Shawnee, and continues south of that city until Tecumseh, where US-270 splits off. South of Asher, Oklahoma, SH-3W leaves US-177 and veers southeast toward Ada.

SH-3E, the longer of the two split routes, was the original routing of Highway 3 before the two highways were split. It remains on I-40 for  after SH-3W splits off. When it does split off, it soon joins SH-18. It follows a route closer to the center of Shawnee. After leaving Shawnee, it heads southeast toward Seminole. Here, it meets US-377/SH-99. SH-3E merges onto this highway, and they will remain concurrent until after they reach Ada.

In Ada, SH-3E and SH-3W are reunited and become SH-3 once again.

Ada to Atoka

SH-3 then becomes part of the Richardson Loop, a freeway around the west and south sides of Ada. Throughout the Richardson Loop, it overlaps SH-1 and US-377/SH-99 at different times. The highway then becomes two-lane once again and heads southeast to the town of Coalgate, where begins an  concurrency with U.S. Highway 75, lasting through Atoka. In Atoka, US-75 splits off to join U.S. Highway 69.

Antlers to Arkansas
Two miles west of Antlers, the highway has an interchange with the Indian Nation Turnpike, and in Antlers it intersects U.S. Highway 271. After reaching the town of Broken Bow, Oklahoma, it turns southward and overlaps US-259 and US-70.

Twenty-eight miles later, it becomes Highway 32 as it crosses the state line into Arkansas.

History
The current SH-3 was designated on 15 May 1939. The original highway included all of current SH-3 up to Antlers, where it terminated at US-271. It was extended to the Arkansas state line on 4 August 1952. SH-3 ended there concurrent with US-70 and SH-7, near DeQueen, Arkansas. On 7 January 1963, the highway was given its own alignment from near Idabel to Arkansas, taking over that of SH-21, which was eliminated at that time.

From the highway's commissioning to 1976, there was only one fork of SH-3 between Shawnee and Ada, which was the path of current SH-3E. SH-3W and SH-3E were created on 4 October 1976; the new SH-3W took over all of SH-13. Other than minor realignments, the highway remains essentially the same today.

In the early 1980s, Governor George Nigh was able to obtain $97.1 million to upgrade the highway between Oklahoma City and Colorado, despite opponents labeling the project "the highway to nowhere". House Concurrent Resolution 1067 labeled the highway as "Governor George Nigh's Northwest Passage." ODOT officially so named the highway on 2 February 1981.

Notes
 SH-3's concurrency with Interstate 44 in Oklahoma City is an example of a wrong-way concurrency – I-44 West is SH-3 East and vice versa.
 SH-3's concurrency with US-70 is also a wrong-way concurrency, as US-70 is signed as going west and SH-3 as going east.
 The SH-3 bypass around Atoka is named the Cecil B. "Bud" Greathouse Bypass. It was designated by ODOT on 4 October 1982.

SH-3A

SH-3 had one lettered spur, SH-3A, which continued the alignment of the Northwest Expressway for two more miles before ending at Interstate 44 near Penn Square Mall. It was originally known as SH-66A, a spur off U.S. Highway 66, which once ran through the area. The combined effect of US-66 being decommissioned and "3A" being a more logical name for an extension of Highway 3 led to the name change. State Highway 3A was decommissioned in 2009.

Junction list

SH-3E

SH-3W

References

External links

 SH-3 at OKHighways.com
 SH-3E at OKHighways.com
 SH-3W at OKHighways.com

003
Transportation in Oklahoma City
Ada, Oklahoma
Transportation in Cimarron County, Oklahoma
Transportation in Texas County, Oklahoma
Transportation in Beaver County, Oklahoma
Transportation in Harper County, Oklahoma
Transportation in Ellis County, Oklahoma
Transportation in Woodward County, Oklahoma
Transportation in Dewey County, Oklahoma
Transportation in Blaine County, Oklahoma
Transportation in Kingfisher County, Oklahoma
Transportation in Canadian County, Oklahoma
Transportation in Oklahoma County, Oklahoma
Transportation in Pottawatomie County, Oklahoma
Transportation in Pontotoc County, Oklahoma
Transportation in Coal County, Oklahoma
Transportation in Atoka County, Oklahoma
Transportation in Pushmataha County, Oklahoma
Transportation in McCurtain County, Oklahoma